Peruvian Democratic Movement (MDP), originally named Pradist Democratic Movement (MDP), was a political party in Peru in 1956. The initiator of the party was Manuel Cisneros Sánchez. Manuel Prado y Ugarteche was the leader of the party. Later MDP took the name Movimiento Democrático Peruano. It governed Peru between 1956 and 1962.

Political parties established in 1956
Defunct political parties in Peru
Conservative parties in Peru